Scott McCartney is The Wall Street Journal's travel editor, as well as a regular columnist for the newspaper.

Background
McCartney currently lives in Dallas, though he is a native of Boston. He attended Duke University and graduated in 1982 with an A.B. in Public Policy Studies. He is the chair of the alumni network for The Chronicle, Duke's independent daily newspaper.

Career
He spent eleven years at the Associated Press, before joining The Wall Street Journal in 1993. He writes a regular column for the Journal, "The Middle Seat", and is also the Travel Editor.

Awards and honors
McCartney won the Online News Association award for online commentary in 2003 for "The Middle Seat" and the George Polk Award for transportation reporting in 2000. He has also been honored by the Deadline Club and New York's chapter of the Society of Professional Journalists.

Works
 Defying the Gods: Inside the New Frontiers of Organ Transplants
 ENIAC: The Triumphs and Tragedies of the World's First Computer
 Trinity's Children: Living Along America's Nuclear Highway.
 Wall Street Journal Guide to Power Travel

References

External links
"The Elliott Interview: Scott McCartney", National Geographic Traveller, IT Blog, May 19, 2009
"Scott McCartney on Air Travelers' Turbulent Times", NPR
"Interview With Scott McCartney: Author of ‘The Wall Street Journal Guide to Power Travel’", World Hum'', Travel Blog, Rob Verger

American male journalists
Sanford School of Public Policy alumni
Living people
The Wall Street Journal people
Year of birth missing (living people)